Mohammadabad-e Kharkash (also Romanized as Moḩammadābād-e Kharkash; also known as Hemmatābād, Moḩammadābād, and Muhammadābād) is a village in Momenabad Rural District, in the Central District of Sarbisheh County, South Khorasan Province, Iran. At the 2006 census, its population was 187, in 56 families.

References 

Populated places in Sarbisheh County